Taehongdan County is a kun, or county, in Ryanggang province, North Korea.  It was originally part of Musan County.

The Taehongdan Revolutionary Battle Site there commemorates battles waged by Kim Il-sung in the area during the anti-Japanese struggle.

Geography
To the north, Taehongdan looks across the Tumen River at China.  It stands on the northwest edge of the Paektu Plateau.  The highest of its many peaks is Changchongsan.  The chief river is the Tumen.  Some 91% of the county's area is taken up by forestland. Due to its inland location, Taehongdan has a continental climate with cold winters.

Administrative divisions
Taehongdan county is divided into 1 ŭp (town) and 9 rodongjagu (workers' districts):

Economy
Logging is an important local industry. Agriculture is also key, with the county leading the nation in potato production and also producing barley, wheat and soybeans. Livestock are also raised in the county, and there is some manufacturing.

Transportation
Taehongdan is served by roads, but not by rail.

See also
Geography of North Korea
Administrative divisions of North Korea
Ryanggang

References

External links
Changed Taehongdan Plain picture album at Naenara

Counties of Ryanggang